The 2017 North Carolina Courage season is the team's first season as a professional women's soccer team. North Carolina Courage plays in the National Women's Soccer League, the top tier of women's soccer in the United States. The Courage finished the regular season atop the table, winning the NWSL Shield and earning a spot in the NWSL Playoffs. After defeating Chicago 1–0 in the semi-finals of the playoffs, it lost 0–1 to Portland in the final.

Review

The team played its previous season as the Western New York Flash, which won the 2016 NWSL Championship. The owners of North Carolina FC purchased the Flash and moved them to Cary, North Carolina, in January 2017 to create the Courage franchise, and retained most of the Flash's roster and coaching staff.

Team

First-team roster

 Source: North Carolina Courage

Transactions

2017 NWSL College Draft

 Source: National Women's Soccer League

In

Out

Competitions

National Women's Soccer League

Preseason

 Source: North Carolina FC

Regular season

 Source: National Women's Soccer League

Postseason playoffs

League table

Results summary

Results by round

Honors and awards

NWSL Team of the Month

NWSL Player of the Week

NWSL Goal of the Week

NWSL Save of the Week

Statistics

 Source: National Women's Soccer League

See also
 2016 Western New York Flash season
 2017 National Women's Soccer League season
 2017 in American soccer

References

Match reports (pre-season)

Match reports (regular season)

External links
 

North Carolina Courage
North Carolina Courage
North Carolina Courage seasons
North Carolina Courage